Sympis is a genus of moths of the family Noctuidae erected by Achille Guenée in 1852.

Description
Palpi upturned and smoothly scaled, where the second joint reaching above vertex of head and long slightly curved third joint. Antennae ciliated in male. Thorax and abdomen smoothly scaled. Tibia spineless, and hairy. The first joint of hind tarsi hairy on the upperside. Forewings with somewhat produced and acute apex.

Species
 Sympis ochreobasis Pagenstecher, 1900
 Sympis parkeri Lucas, 1894
 Sympis rufibasis Guenée, 1852

References

 
 

Calpinae